Heather Getha-Taylor is a professor at the University of Kansas School of Public Affairs and Administration.  Her work focuses on public and nonprofit management within the field of public administration, with emphasis on human resource management, collaboration and public service leadership.

Getha-Taylor is editor-in-chief of the journal Public Personnel Management. She served as book review editor for Public Integrity from 2015-2017.

Education and academic career 
Getha-Taylor received her bachelor's degree from Augusta State University (now Augusta University) and her master's degree from the University of Georgia. She has a PhD in Public Administration from the Maxwell School of Citizenship and Public Affairs, Syracuse University.

In September 2021, Getha-Taylor was invited to speak at her Augusta University to the Master of Public Administration program.

Publications 
Getha-Taylor has authored or co-authored over 60 academic works.
 H,Getha-Taylor, "Identifying collaborative competencies", Review of Public Personnel Administration 28 (2), 2008, 103-119
 H, Getha-Taylor, MH Holmes, WS Jacobson, RS Morse, JE Sowa, "Focusing the public leadership lens: Research propositions and questions in the Minnowbrook tradition", Journal of Public Administration Research and Theory 21 (suppl_1), 2011, i83-i97
 H Getha-Taylor, RS Morse, "Collaborative leadership development for local government officials: Exploring competencies and program impact", Public Administration Quarterly, 2013. 71-102
 PW Ingraham, H Getha-Taylor, "Leadership in the public sector: Models and assumptions for leadership development in the federal government", Review of Public Personnel Administration 24 (2), 2004, 95-112
 H Getha-Taylor, J Fowles, C Silvia, CC Merritt, "Considering the effects of time on leadership development: A local government training evaluation", Public Personnel Management 44 (3), 2015, 295-316

Awards 

 Steeples Service to Kansans Award, University of Kansas, 2016
 Hubert Project Fellow, University of Minnesota Humphrey School, 2017
 Honorable Mention Award, E-PARCC Teaching Case/Simulation Competition, 2018
 Faculty Teacher of the Year, KU School of Public Affairs and Administration, 2021

References

External links 

 

American women academics
American women sociologists

Living people
Year of birth missing (living people)